Mohammad Rezaei (born March 21, 1978 in Nahavand) is an Iranian wrestler.

References

External links
 Mohammad Rezaei profile at FILA

1978 births
Living people
Asian Games bronze medalists for Iran
Asian Games medalists in wrestling
Wrestlers at the 2002 Asian Games
Iranian male sport wrestlers
Medalists at the 2002 Asian Games
People from Nahavand
Asian Wrestling Championships medalists
20th-century Iranian people
21st-century Iranian people